Engelhard is a surname. Notable people with the surname include:

Charles W. Engelhard Jr. (1917–1971), American industrialist
Hermann Engelhard (1903–1984), German athlete
Jane Engelhard (1917–2004), American philanthropist

See also
Engelhardt